"Shame, Shame, Shame" is a 1974 hit song written by Sylvia Robinson, performed by American disco band Shirley & Company and released on the Vibration label. The lead singer is Shirley Goodman, who was one half of Shirley and Lee, who had enjoyed a major hit 18 years earlier, in 1956, with the song "Let The Good Times Roll" for Aladdin Records. The male vocalist is Jesus Alvarez. The saxophone solo is by Seldon Powell, whose instrumental version, "More Shame", is the B-side.

The track, with its prominent use of the Bo Diddley beat, was one of the first international disco hits and reached number 12 on the Billboard charts. It also made number one on the Billboard soul singles chart for one week. The phrases "got my sun roof down, got my diamond in the back" appeared as "diamond in the back, sun roof top" in William DeVaughn's 1974 hit "Be Thankful for What You Got" and "one monkey don't stop no show" was used as the title of Honey Cone's 1971 hit "One Monkey Don't Stop No Show (Part 1)" and several others. 

"Shame, Shame, Shame" also stayed at number one on the Billboard disco/dance charts for four weeks. A full-length album, Shame, Shame, Shame was subsequently recorded and released in 1975.

Charts

Weekly charts

Year-end charts

Cover versions
Linda Fields & the Funky Boys recorded a version, sounding nearly identical and released it as a single in 1975; it was re-released in 1983 as a 12" EP. The version appears on several disco compilation albums and is often confused with the original. Their version charted concurrently with the original in New Zealand, reaching number 24.

Ike & Tina Turner recorded a version that was released on the 1980 album The Edge, it reached number 27 on the Billboard Disco chart. In 1982, the song was released as a single in Europe and peaked at number 47 in the Netherlands.

Izabella Scorupco version

Polish-Swedish singer, actress and model Izabella Scorupco recorded a very successful cover version of "Shame, Shame, Shame" in 1992, which was accompanied by a black-and-white music video directed by Swedish director Jonas Åkerlund. It was produced by record producer and musician Christian Falk and became a chart hit in a number of European countries. In Norway and Sweden, it reached number two. The single was a Top 10 hit also in Belgium, Denmark and the Netherlands, where it peaked at number four and six. It appears on an extended version of her 1991 album, Iza.

Track listing

Charts

Weekly charts

Year-end charts

Sinitta version

Critical reception
Alan Jones from Music Week called the song "light, frothy, bouncy concentrated pop. A substantial hit."

Charts

See also
List of number-one hits of 1975 (Germany)
List of number-one dance singles of 1975 (U.S.)
List of number-one R&B singles of 1975 (U.S.)

References

1974 singles
1992 singles
Number-one singles in Germany
Disco songs
Songs written by Sylvia Robinson
Song recordings produced by Mark Taylor (record producer)
Philips Records singles
Arista Records singles
Virgin Records singles
Ike & Tina Turner songs
Sinitta songs
Henri Salvador songs
A-Teens songs
1974 songs